Mamilla Shailaja Priya (born 20 May 1981), popularly known as Priya, is an Indian actress. She appears primarily Telugu feature films and television soap operas, and has also acted in Hindi and Tamil language films.

She made her acting debut in 1998 with the movie Master which featured Chiranjeevi. She has won the Nandi Award presented by the government of Andhra Pradesh for her role in this serial Priya Sakhi. Apart from soap operas, she has acted in about 200 feature films in Telugu and Hindi with various co stars like Bala krishna, Chiranjeevi, Pawan Kalyan, Venkatesh, Nagarjuna and Amitabh Bachchan.

Early and personal life 
Popularly known as Priya, Mamilla Shailaja Priya was born in 1981, in Bapatla, Andhra Pradesh. Her parents are Mamilla Venkateswar Rao and Mamilla Kusuma Kumari. She is the third child, among three sisters. She did her schooling in Hyderabad, Telangana. While in college, she won the Miss College Pageant. She later started pursuing her acting career. She completed her graduation with a B.A.. Priya married Venkata Kishore Machiraju in 2002. They have a son, Nischay, who was born in 2003. They reside in Hyderabad.

Awards

She won Nandi Award presented by the government of Andhra Pradesh  very early in her career. She was also the recipient of various awards like the Dasari Cultural Award, Swathi Cultural Award, and Vamsee Berkeley Award. She won the Cine Goers Award and Gemini Ugadi Puraskaram for her portrayal of the character Bhuvaneshwari in Kotha Bangaaram.

Career

Television 
She started her television career with the runaway hit Priya Sakhi in which she portrayed the lead role which had different shades(ranging from the young to the old).It was so popular that she is still identified as "Priyasakhi" Priya and the name stuck to her. She has acted in serials like Priya Ninu Choodaleka and Priya O Priya. Later, she has acted in almost all the leading Television channels in Telugu and Tamil. Her serials include Lady Detective, Sangarshana, Pelli Chesukundam & Jwaala for ETV, Dairy of Mrs Sharada & Kotha Bangaaram for Gemini TV, Maanasa for Maa TV, Vaidehi for Doordarshan, Chinna Kodalu for Zee TV, and Naagamma in Tamil for Sun TV. She has also done a Hindi serial titled Yehi hai Zindagi. She has also done in Vani Rani serial in Tamil which aired on Sun TV. She is currently acting in the serial Kalyani in Telugu which airs on Gemini TV and Piriyadha Varam Vendum and Chocolate in Tamil which airs on Zee Tamizh and Sun TV.

Santoor top 10 was a program anchored by Priya which ran for two years in Gemini Channel and she had portrayed different characters in each episode of the show. Similarly, Geethanjali was another music based show anchored by Priya for ETV and ran for a year. Endaro Mahanubhavulu is another show anchored by Priya which portrayed the achievements of various famous people in Andhra Pradesh from all walks of life.

She has appeared in commercials for brands like Chandana Brothers, Shakthi Gas, Til Sona Oil and Kanchan Mixer Grinder. She has been credited with the cover page of the most popular Telugu family magazine, Swathi. And also she is one of the 19 contestant in  Bigg Boss Telugu season 5

Films
She started her acting career with Chiranjeevi-starrer Master in 1997. In all, she has acted in about 60 feature films, often appearing alongside leading stars of Telugu film industry. She was a constant accompaniment to almost all the leading heroines in her movies. Some of her movies are Master & Annayya with Chiranjeevi, Gokulamlo Seetha with Pawan Kalyan, Chandra Lekha with Nagarjuna, Raja Kumarudu with Mahesh Babu, Jayam Manadera with Venkatesh and most importantly, Soorya Vamsham in Hindi Amithabh Bachchan.

Her other films include Taamboolalu, Pedda Manushulu, Maa Vidaakulu, Greeku Veerudu, Sakutumba Saparivara Samethamga, Velugu Needalu, Dongaata, Chiru Navvutho, Harishchandra, Madhuri, Manavudu Danavudu, Sambhavam and Kathi Kantha Rao. In 2012 she appeared in Nagarjuna's most acclaimed Dhamarukam. She played Richa Gangopadhyay's mother in Prabhas's Mirchi and appeared in Iddarammayilatho as mother of Catherine Tresa's character.

Filmography

 Dongaata (1997) as Subbalakshmi's friend
 Gokulamlo Seeta (1997) as Sirisha's younger sister
 Master (1997)
 Maavidaakulu (1998)
 Sri Sita Ramula Kalyanam Chootamu Raarandi (1998) as Priya
 Chandralekha (1998) as Bangari
 Suryudu (1998)
 Suprabhatam (1998)
 Raja Kumarudu (1999)
 Harischandraa (1999)
 Velugu Needalu (1999)
 Moodu Mukkalaata (2000)
 Annayya (2000)
 Jayam Manadera (2000) as Uma's friend
 Chiru Navvutho (2000) as Priya
 Kathi Kantha Rao (2010) as Kantha Rao's sister
 Damarukam (2012) as Mallikarjuna's mother
 Mirchi (2013) as Manasa's mother
 Iddarammayilatho (2013) as Akanksha's mother
 Pilla Nuvvu Leni Jeevitham (2014) as Parvati
 S/o Satyamurthy (2015) as Sameera's mother
 Dohchay (2015) as Chandu's mother
 Pandaga Chesko (2015) as Lakshmi
  Bengal Tiger (2015) as Siddappa's wife
 Kerintha (2015) as Sonia's mother
 Babu Bangaram (2016) as Mallesh Yadav's wife
 Hyper (2016) as Gaja's wife
 Winner (2017) as Rajeev Reddy's wife
 Rarandoi Veduka Chudham (2017) as Priya
 Prematho Mee Karthik (2017)
 Mersal (2017 - Tamil) as Tara's mother
 Pantham (2018) as Akshara's mother
 Aatagallu (2018) as Anjali's mother
 Srinivasa Kalyanam (2018) as Vasu's aunt
 Nartanasala (2018) as Radha's mother
 Nela Ticket (2018) as Old man's daughter-in-law
 Jai Simha (2018) as Raju Reddy's wife
 Venky Mama (2019) as Harika's mother
 Alludu Adhurs (2021) as Gaja's sister
 Zombie Reddy (2021) as Mario's mother
 Uppena (2021) as Raayanam's sister
 Sreekaram (2021) as Ekambaram's wife

Television

Telugu

Serials 
Priya Sakhi (Gemini TV)
Priya Ninu Choodaleka
Priya O Priya
Lady Detective (ETV)
Sangarshana (ETV)
Pelli Chesukundam (ETV)
Jwaala (ETV)
Dairy of Mrs Sharada (Gemini TV)
Kotha Bangaaram (Gemini TV)
Maanasa (Maa TV)
Chinna Kodalu (Zee Telugu)
Sasirekha Parinayam (Maa TV)
Kalyani (Gemini TV) as Tulasi Devi
No. 1 Kodalu (Zee Telugu) as Shambhavi
Nandhini vs Nandhini (ETV)
Krishna Mukunda Murari (Star Maa)
Vontari Gulabi (GeminiTV) as Sridevi

Shows 
Santoor Top 10 (Gemini TV)
Geethanjali (ETV)
Endaro Mahanubhavulu
Bigg Boss 5 (Star Maa)

Tamil

References

External links
 

1978 births
Living people
Telugu comedians
Actresses in Telugu cinema
Indian film actresses
Telugu actresses
People from Guntur district
Actresses from Andhra Pradesh
Indian women comedians
Actresses in Telugu television
Indian television actresses
20th-century Indian actresses
21st-century Indian actresses
Bigg Boss (Telugu TV series) contestants